The European Heart Journal is a peer-reviewed medical journal of cardiology published by Oxford University Press on a weekly basis, on behalf of the European Society of Cardiology. The first issue was published in February 1980.

Overview 
The medical journal publishes both clinical and scientific papers on all aspects of cardiovascular medicine. It includes articles related to research findings, technical evaluations, and reviews. In addition, the journal features reviews, clinical perspectives, podcasts, and editorial articles about recent developments in cardiology, and encourages correspondence from its readers. Another important aspect of the journal are the ESC Clinical Practice Guidelines, which cover all areas of cardiology.

In 2020, the journal had an impact factor of 29.983, ranking it as one of the highest journals in the field of cardiology.

Thomas F. Lüscher (Royal Brompton and Harefield Hospital Trust and Universität Zürich) was succeeded by Filippo Crea as the editor-in-chief.

Specialty journals 
In addition to the European Heart Journal, Oxford University Press publishes several other specialty journals on behalf of the European Society of Cardiology, each of which is focused on a specific subdiscipline of cardiology. These are:
 European Heart Journal: Acute Cardiovascular Care
 European Heart Journal: Cardiovascular Pharmacotherapy
 European Heart Journal: Cardiovascular Imaging
 European Heart Journal: Case Reports
 European Heart Journal: Quality of Care & Clinical Outcomes

See also
 Journal of the American College of Cardiology

External links 
 
 European Society of Cardiology

Cardiology journals
Oxford University Press academic journals
English-language journals
Weekly journals
Publications established in 1980